Holy Trinity Catholic High School, colloquially known as "HT", is a Roman Catholic high schools in Ontario.

The high school is located in Simcoe, Ontario, Canada. School uniforms are mandatory during school hours, and courses are conducted in a theological manner. Though it is a Roman Catholic school, the student population has Catholic and non-Catholic components. On October 25, 2013, a fire was deliberately set in a girl's first floor washroom. Damage was totaled to be over $75,000. 
The Super Cities Walk for Multiple Sclerosis held in Simcoe's Holy Trinity Catholic High School raised more than $57,000 in donations for multiple sclerosis. Famous illusionist, Lucas Wilson, attended this school from 2004-2008 and has broken several Guinness World records including “most times broken out of a straight jacket in 1 hour.”

Expansion

The school was founded in September 2001, with an initial enrollment of 750 students. The school outgrew the main building's original capacity of 1,000 students and an annex was built to accommodate the increase in enrollment. Construction for the annex began in 2006. John Burroughs, the principal at that time, expected enrollment to peak in the following years. The addition was ready for use in September 2007 with ten classrooms, a food services classroom and a conference room in the southwest corner of the school.

Amenities

Technology
The technology department at Holy Trinity consists of Communication, Construction, Cosmetology, Design/Drafting, Manufacturing, Culinary Arts and Transportation. Some of the technology includes:
Haas CNC Milling Machine
AXYZ CNC Router
iMac G5 Computers with Final Cut Studio and Logic Pro software
Smart Board, an interactive board which doubles as a computer screen; projectors are required for this board.
Daily televised announcements from the school television network (formerly Trinity Vision Network or "TVN", it was renamed to Holy Trinity Television or "HTTV" following a studio update before the 2013-2014 school year).  This is also available online and in a video podcast, still available today on their YouTube channel. 

Comprehensive transportation (automotive) shop
Cosmetology course teaching hairstyling and aesthetics

Athletics
The secondary school is represented in many different intramural sports as the Holy Trinity Titans. Titan teams include swimming, soccer, rugby, track and field, badminton, tug-o-war, golf, basketball, hockey, tennis, cheerleading, volleyball, cross-country, football, figure skating and rowing. Holy Trinity's fundraising efforts in the 2006-2007 school year raised enough money to start a football team for the school.  The football team played its first game in September 2007. In 2018 the boys hockey team won the A/AA OFSAA championship held in Collingwood.

See also
List of high schools in Ontario

References

Damage from fire now reaches $75G
Holy Trinity Catholic High School

External links
Holy Trinity Catholic High School

Educational institutions established in 2001
High schools in Norfolk County, Ontario
Catholic secondary schools in Ontario
2001 establishments in Ontario